Connecticut v. ExxonMobil Corp is a climate change litigation case brought on ExxonMobil for seeking profit despite knowing the damages it would produce on the environment. 

On Monday, September 15, 2020, Connecticut Attorney General William Tong filed a lawsuit against ExxonMobil for their products contributed to the emissions that cause global warming and climate change. The state is "seeking compensation for past, present and future harm from climate change, including for investments already made, and is going after some of the company’s profits."  

Connecticut accuses ExxonMobil about misleading investors to how their products contribute to climate change.  Tong says the state is facing millions in "damage due to rising sea levels, more storms, increased erosion and other impacts from climate change.   Tong claims ExxonMobil knows that burning fossil fuels impact the environment, but instead of admitting it, they try to deceive the public.   The case was filed to the Hartford Superior Court.

References 

Legal history of Connecticut
ExxonMobil litigation
Climate justice
Climate change litigation
United States environmental case law
2020 in the environment
2020 in United States case law
2020 in Connecticut